Peter Handke (born 6 December 1942) is an Austrian novelist, playwright and political activist.

Bibliography

1966 , (The Hornets), novel
1966 Publikumsbeschimpfung und andere Sprechstücke, (Offending the Audience and Other Spoken Plays), play, English version in Offending the Audience and Self-accusation
1967 Begrüßung des Aufsichtsrates, (Welcoming the Supervisor), prose texts
1967 Der Hausierer, (The Peddler), novel
1967 Kaspar, play, English version also in Kaspar and Other Plays
1969 Deutsche Gedichte, German Poems, poetry
1969 Die Innenwelt der Außenwelt der Innenwelt, (The Innerworld of the Outerworld of the Innerworld), text collages
1969 Prosa, Gedichte, Theaterstücke, Hörspiele, Aufsätze, (Prose, Poems, Plays, Radio Plays, Essays), collected texts
1969 Das Mündel will Vormund sein, (The Ward Wants To Be Warden), play
1970 Die Angst des Tormanns beim Elfmeter, (The Goalie's Anxiety at the Penalty Kick), novel and screenplay of 1972 film
1970 Geschichten aus dem Wienerwald von Ödön von Horvath, (Stories from the Wienerwald by Ödon von Horvath), re-narration
1970 Wind und Meer. Vier Hörspiele, (Wind and Sea: Four Radio Plays)
1971 Chronik der laufenden Ereignisse, (Chronicle of Current Events)
1971 Der Ritt über den Bodensee, (The Ride across Lake Constance), play
1972 Der kurze Brief zum langen Abschied, (Short Letter, Long Farewell), novel
1972 Ich bin ein Bewohner des Elfenbeinturms, (I Am a Resident of the Ivory Tower), essays
1972 Stücke 1, (Plays 1)
1972 Wunschloses Unglück, (A Sorrow Beyond Dreams: A Life Story), story
1973 , (They Are Dying Out), play
1973 Stücke 2, (Plays 2)
1974 Als das Wünschen noch geholfen hat. Gedichte, Aufsätze, Texte, Fotos, (When Hope still Helped: Poems, Essays, Texts, Photos)
1975 Der Rand der Wörter. Erzählungen, Gedichte, Stücke, (The Words' Edge: Stories, Poems, Plays)
1975 Die Stunde der wahren Empfindung, (A Moment of True Feeling), story
1975 Falsche Bewegung, (Wrong Move), novel
1976 Die linkshändige Frau, (The Left-Handed Woman), film version 1977
1977 Das Ende des Flanierens. Gedichte, (Strolling Comes to an End. Poems)
1977 Das Gewicht der Welt. Ein Journal, (The Weight of the World. A Journal), texts
1979 Langsame Heimkehr, (The Long Way Round), story. Also in Slow Homecoming
1980 Die Lehre der Sainte-Victoire, (The Lesson of Mount Sainte-Victoire), story, in Slow Homecoming
1981 Über die Dörfer, (Walk about the Villages), theatrical poem
1981 Kindergeschichte, (Children's Story), story, in Slow Homecoming
1982 Die Geschichte des Bleistifts, (History of the Pencil), texts
1983 , (Across), story
1984 Phantasien der Wiederholung, (Phantasies of Repetition),
1986 Die Wiederholung, (Repetition)
1987 Der Himmel über Berlin, (Wings of Desire) with Wim Wenders, screenplay
1987 Die Abwesenheit. Ein Märchen, (Absence), film version directed by Handke 1992
1987 Gedichte, (Poems)
1987 Nachmittag eines Schriftstellers, (Afternoon of a Writer), story
1989 Das Spiel vom Fragen oder Die Reise zum sonoren Land, (Voyage to the Sonorous Land or the Art of Asking), play
1989 Versuch über die Müdigkeit, (Essay About Tiredness), essay
1990 Noch einmal für Thukydides, (Once Again for Thucydides)', texts
1990 Versuch über die Jukebox, (Essay About the Jukebox), Engl. version in The Jukebox and Other Essays on Storytelling.
1991 Abschied des Träumers vom Neunten Land, (The Dreamer's Farewell to the Ninth Country), texts
1991 Versuch über den geglückten Tag. Ein Wintertagtraum, (Essay about the Successful Day: A Winter Day's Dream)
1992 Die Stunde, da wir nichts voneinander wußten, (The Hour We Knew Nothing Of Each Other), wordless play
1992 Die Theaterstücke, (The Theatrical Plays)
1992 Drei Versuche. Versuch über die Müdigkeit. Versuch über die Jukebox. Versuch über den geglückten Tag, (Three Essays: about Tiredness; Essay about the Jukebox; Essay about the Successful Day)
1992 Langsam im Schatten. Gesammelte Verzettelungen 1980-1992, (Slowly in the Shade: Collected Dispersals 1980-1992), texts
1994 Die Kunst des Fragens, (The Art of Questioning), texts
1994 Mein Jahr in der Niemandsbucht. Ein Märchen aus den neuen Zeiten, (My Year in the No-Man's-Bay), novel
1996 Eine winterliche Reise zu den Flüssen Donau, Save, Morawa und Drina oder Gerechtigkeit für Serbien, (A Journey to the Rivers: Justice for Serbia), essay
1996 Sommerlicher Nachtrag zu einer winterlichen Reise, (A Summer Addendum to a Winter's Journey), essay
1997 Zurüstungen für die Unsterblichkeit. Königsdrama, (Preparations for Immortality: A Royal Drama), play
1997 In einer dunklen Nacht ging ich aus meinem stillen Haus, (On a Dark Night I Left My Silent House), story
1998 Am Felsfenster morgens. Und andere Ortszeiten 1982 - 1987, (At the Mountain Window in the Morning: And Other Local Times 1982 - 1987), texts
1998 Ein Wortland. Eine Reise durch Kärnten, Slowenien, Friaul, Istrien und Dalmatien, with Liesl Ponger, (A Land of Words: A Journey through Carinthia, Slovenia, Friaul, Istria and Dalmatia), essay
1999 Die Fahrt im Einbaum oder Das Stück zum Film vom Krieg, (Voyage by Dugout), play
1999 , (Lucie in the Forest with the Thingie), texts
2000 Unter Tränen fragend. Nachträgliche Aufzeichnungen von zwei Jugoslawien-Durchquerungen im Krieg, März und April 1999, (Asking through the Tears: Belated Chronicle from two Crossings through Yugoslavia During the War, March and April 1999), texts
2002 Der Bildverlust oder Durch die Sierra de Gredos, (Crossing the Sierra de Gredos)
2002 Mündliches und Schriftliches. Zu Büchern, Bildern und Filmen 1992-2000, (Spoken and Written: about Books, Images and Films 1992-2000), essays
2002 Untertagblues. Ein Stationendrama, (Underground Blues: a Station Play)
2004 Don Juan (erzählt von ihm selbst), (Don Juan - His Own Version), novel
2005 Die Tablas von Daimiel, (The Tablas of Daimiel), essay
2005 Gestern unterwegs, (Travelling Yesterday), texts
2006 Spuren der Verirrten, play
2007 Kali. Eine Vorwintergeschichte, novel
2008 Die morawische Nacht, (The Moravian Night)
2009 Die Kuckucke von Velica Hoca, intimate reportage of a Serbian enclave in Kosovo
2010 Immer noch Sturm (Storm Still), a play about the Slovenian uprising against Hitler in 1945, ; first performance: Salzburg Festival 2011
2011 Der große Fall, 
2011 Die Geschichte des Dragoljub Milanović, 
2012 Die schönen Tage von Aranjuez. Ein Sommerdialog, 
2012 Versuch über den Stillen Ort, 
2013 Versuch über den Pilznarren. Eine Geschichte für sich, 
2015 Die Unschuldigen, ich und die Unbekannte am Rand der Landstraße. Ein Schauspiel in vier Jahreszeiten, 
2015 Tage und Werke. Begleitschreiben, 
2015 Notizbuch - 31. August 1978 – 18. Oktober 1978, 
2016 Vor der Baumschattenwand nachts. Zeichen und Anflüge von der Peripherie 2007–2015, 
2017 Die Obstdiebin. Oder Einfache Fahrt ins Landesinnere, novel 
2020 Das zweite Schwert, novel

English editions
Many of Handke's works have been published in several English-speaking countries by different publishers. Only one edition of each work is listed.

1970 Kaspar and Other Plays, Hill and Wang, 
1971 Offending the Audience/Self-accusation, Methuen Publishing Ltd, 
1972 The Goalie's Anxiety at the Penalty Kick, Farrar Straus & Giroux, 
1973 The Ride Across Lake Constance, Methuen Publishing Ltd, 
1974 Slow Homecoming, Collier Books, 
1974 Short Letter, Long Farewell, Farrar Straus & Giroux, 
1974 The Innerworld of the Outerworld of the Innerworld, A Continuum Book/The Seabury Press, 
1976 They Are Dying Out, Eyre Methuen, 
1976 Ride Across Lake Constance and Other Plays, Noonday Press, 
1976 Nonsense and Happiness, Urizen Books, 
1977 A Moment of True Feeling, Farrar Straus & Giroux, 
1978 The Left-Handed Woman, Farrar Straus & Giroux, 
1979 Two Novels by Peter Handke, Avon, 
1984 3 X Handke, Collier Books, 
1984 The Weight of the World, Farrar Straus & Giroux, 
1985 Three by Peter Handke, Avon, 
1986 Across, Farrar Straus & Giroux, 
1989 The Afternoon of a Writer, Farrar Straus & Giroux, 
1990 Absence, Farrar Straus & Giroux, 
1994 The Jukebox and Other Essays on Storytelling, Farrar Straus & Giroux, 
1996 Walk About the Villages : A Dramatic Poem, Farrar Straus & Giroux, 
1996 Voyage to the Sonorous Land : Or the Art of Asking and the Hour We Knew Nothing of Each Other, Yale University Press, 
1997 A Journey to the Rivers : Justice for Serbia, Viking, 
1998 Once Again for Thucydides, New Directions Publishing Corporation, 
1998 My Year in the No-Man's-Bay , Farrar Straus & Giroux, 
2000 On a Dark Night I Left My Silent House, Farrar Straus & Giroux, 
2001 A Sorrow Beyond Dreams, Pushkin Press, 
2002 A Sorrow Beyond Dreams, New York Review Books Classics, 
2003 Handke Plays, Methuen Publishing Ltd, 
2007 Crossing the Sierra de Gredos, Farrar Straus & Giroux, 
2009 Voyage by Dugout, Performing Arts Journal, May 2012
2009 Slow Homecoming, NYRB Classics, 
2010 Don Juan - His Own Version, Farrar, Straus & Giroux, 
2010 Till day you do part, or, A question of light, Seagull Books, 
2013 Repetition, The Last Books, 
2014 Storm Still, Seagull Books, 
2016 The Moravian Night, Farrar, Straus & Giroux, 
2016 The Great Fall, Seagull Books, 
2022 The Fruit Thief: or, One-Way Journey into the Interior, Farrar, Straus & Giroux, 
2022 Quiet Places: Collected Essays, Farrar, Straus & Giroux,

References

 

Bibliographies of Austrian writers
Bibliography